Earnest Lee Holmes (July 11, 1948 – January 17, 2008) was an American football defensive tackle who played in the National Football League (NFL) for seven seasons, primarily with the Pittsburgh Steelers. Nicknamed "Fats", he was selected by the Steelers in the eighth round of the 1971 NFL Draft and won two Super Bowl titles with the team. He spent all but one season of his career in Pittsburgh, retiring in 1978 after a stint with the New England Patriots.

Early life
Holmes was born in Jamestown, Texas, and was raised on his family's farm. And he went to school in Wiergate, Texas  Holmes played college football at Texas Southern University.

Professional career
Holmes was selected by Pittsburgh Steelers in the eighth round of the 1971 NFL Draft. He was part of the legendary Steel Curtain defense along with fellow linemen Joe Greene, Dwight White, and L. C. Greenwood. While quarterback sacks were not an official NFL statistic until 1982, the Steelers credit Holmes with a career total of 40, eighth on the franchise's all-time list. This includes team-high totals of 11 in 1974 (including a stretch of six consecutive games with a sack, which ties him with Greene and Greg Lloyd for the longest such streak in team history) and 10.5 in 1975.

He was intensely fierce on the playing field and was often characterized as the most feared man on the Steelers defense. Prior to his third season in 1973, Holmes had an emotional breakdown while driving on the Ohio Turnpike on March 16, firing shots at a police helicopter as it pursued him. He was charged with shooting at a Highway Patrol heli-pilot. Holmes was found in a field near his abandoned car in Goshen Township, Mahoning County, Ohio. When apprehended, he threw his gun away and put his hands up. He was given five years' probation. Diagnosed with acute paranoid psychosis, he was believed to be depressed and having marital troubles.

Holmes played six seasons with the Steelers before being traded due to on-going weight problems in 1978 to the Tampa Bay Buccaneers, where he failed to make the team coming out of preseason. He played three games for the New England Patriots that season before retiring.

Holmes' number 63 was later issued to All-Pro center Dermontti Dawson.

Other activities
Following the end of his NFL career, Holmes became a wrestler and actor.
He made one film appearance in 1985's Fright Night as a bouncer killed by Chris Sarandon's vampire character. The following year, Holmes appeared in WrestleMania 2 and made other appearances as a professional wrestler. He also appeared in an episode of The A-Team.

Personal life and death
Until his death, Holmes lived in Texas on a ranch near Wiergate, a small town with a population of 461 near the Louisiana border, where he had his own church and was an ordained minister.

Holmes died in a one-car accident near Beaumont, Texas on the night of January 17, 2008. Holmes was thrown from his car and was pronounced dead at the scene, according to the Texas Department of Transportation. He had not been wearing a seat belt.

Holmes was buried at the Pine Hill Cemetery in Jamestown, Texas.

Filmography

References

External links
  Ernie Holmes stats at databasefootball.com
 Rooney: 'Holmes Will Be Missed By Steelers Family
 Ernie: A Potholed Road To Tampa Bay

American football defensive tackles
2008 deaths
1948 births
Pittsburgh Steelers players
New England Patriots players
Texas Southern Tigers football players
Road incident deaths in Texas
People from Smith County, Texas